The English actor and comedian Ian Carmichael OBE (1920–2010) performed in many mediums of light entertainment, including theatre, radio, television and film. His career spanned from 1939 until his death in 2010. According to Brian McFarlane, writing for The Encyclopedia of British Film, Carmichael "epitomises the good-natured, undemanding pleasures of '50s British cinema".

Carmichael made his professional stage debut in 1939 while he was studying at the Royal Academy of Dramatic Art; his role was as a robot in the science fiction play R.U.R., which lasted for only a week. His studies were interrupted by the Second World War, and he was commissioned into the Royal Armoured Corps; he also joined an entertainment unit, 30 Corps Theatrical Pool, for which he produced twenty shows. At the end of the war he returned to professional acting, and in 1947 he took a role in She Wanted a Cream Front Door, which ran in the West End for nine months. He continued to perform in the theatre throughout the rest of  his career, largely in the UK, but also in productions in Canada, South Africa and the USA. In 1947 Carmichael made his debut on television in the revue New Faces. He continued to work in television throughout his life and, according to McFarlane, achieved considerable success with P.G. Wodehouse's The World of Wooster in 1966–67, in which he played Bertie Wooster, and as Lord Peter Wimsey between 1972 and 1975.

Carmichael made his radio debut in 1947 in the BBC Home Service's Saturday Night Theatre, and continued to appear throughout his career. Included in his output were dramatisations of the Wimsey novels and Wodehouse's works, this time as Galahad Threepwood in the Blandings Castle stories. In 1948 Carmichael made his cinematic debut in an uncredited role in Bond Street, and went on to establish a film career in the 1950s when he appeared in films by the Boulting brothers, including Private's Progress (1956), Lucky Jim (1957), Brothers in Law (1957), Happy Is the Bride (1958) and I'm All Right Jack (1959). On Carmichael's death in 2010 Dennis Barker, writing for The Guardian, observed that "what made Carmichael notable was that he could play fool parts in a way that did not cut the characters completely off from human sympathy: a certain dignity was always maintained."

Stage credits

Radio broadcasts

Television

Filmography

Notes and references

Notes

References

Sources

External links
 Ian Carmichael at the BFI
 
 
 

Male actor filmographies
British filmographies